Cephalaspis (from  , 'head' and  , 'shield') is a possibly monotypic genus of extinct osteostracan agnathan vertebrate. It was a trout-sized detritivorous fish that lived in the early Devonian.

Description
Like its relatives, Cephalaspis was heavily armored, presumedly to defend against predatory placoderms and eurypterids, as well as to serve as a source of calcium for metabolic functions in calcium-poor freshwater environments. It had sensory patches along the rim and center of its head shield, which were used to sense for worms and other burrowing organisms in the mud.

Diet
Because its mouth was situated directly beneath its head, Cephalaspis was thought of as being a bottom-feeder, akin to a heavily armoured catfish or sturgeon. It moved its plow-like head from side to side, Cephalaspis easily stirring sand and dust into the water, along with revealing the hiding places of its prey, digging up worms or crustaceans hidden in the mud and algae, as well as sifting through detritus (inferred from its lack of jaws and inability to bite).

Classification
The genus Cephalaspis has long been used as a wastebasket taxon since Agassiz erected it in 1835 for four species, C. lyelli, C. rostratus, C. lewisi and C. lloydi. Later, it was eventually determined that the last three species were portions of what would eventually be described as the heterostracan Pteraspis rostratus. C. lyelli, named after Sir Charles Lyell, would be left to be the type species of the genus. Other researchers would continue adding other similar-looking osteostracans throughout the decades until, in 2009, Sansom reevaluated Osteostraci, and determined that only C. lyelli could be reliably placed within Cephalaspis, and that probably all other species would eventually need to be reexamined and be placed into other genera. In the same 2009 study, Sansom also determined that Cephalaspis sensu stricto was the sister-taxon of cornuate osteostracans, i.e., all osteostracans that either have, or have ancestors that had defined corners on the head-shields.

Included species

The following is a list of species that have been included into Cephalaspis; most likely do not belong to the genus, but have not been formally moved.
 †Cephalaspis lyelli (Agassiz, 1835) (type species)
 †"Cephalaspis" aarhusi (Wangsjö, 1952)
 †"Cephalaspis" agassizi (Lankester, 1868)
 †"Cephalaspis" brevirostris (Denison, 1952)
 †"Cephalaspis" broughi (Wangsjö, 1952)
 †Cephalaspis cradleyensis (Stensiö, 1932)
 †"Cephalaspis" dissimulata (Wangsjö, 1952)
 †"Cephalaspis" doryphorus (Wangsjö, 1952)
 †"Cephalaspis" fletti (Stensiö, 1932)
 †"Cephalaspis" fraticornis (Wangsjö, 1952)
 †"Cephalaspis" hyperboreus (Wangsjö, 1952)
 †"Cephalaspis" lankestri (Stensiö, 1932)
 †"Cephalaspis" lornensis (Traquair, 1899)
 †"Cephalaspis" microlepidota (Balabai, 1962)
 †"Cephalaspis" novaescotiae (Denison, 1955)
 †"Cephalaspis" platycephalus (Wangsjö, 1952)
 †"Cephalaspis" producta (Wangsjö, 1952)
 †"Cephalaspis" recticornis (Wangsjö, 1952)
 †"Cephalaspis" spinifer (Stensiö, 1923)
 †"Cephalaspis" tenuicornis (Wangsjö, 1952)
 †"Cephalaspis" verrulosa (Wangsjö, 1952)
 †"Cephalaspis" websteri (Stensiö, 1932)
 †"Cephalaspis" whitbachensis (Stensiö, 1932)
 †"Cephalaspis" wyomingensis (Denison, 1952)

Species of Cephalaspis that have been reassigned

 †Cephalaspis corystis (Wangsjö, 1952) = Machairaspis corystis
 †Cephalaspis excellens (Wangsjö, 1952) = Waengsjoeaspis excellens
 †Cephalaspis elegans (Balabai, 1962) = Zychaspis siemiradzkii
 †Cephalaspis hastata (Wangsjö, 1952) = Machairaspis hastata
 †Cephalaspis hoeli (Stensiö, 1927) = Mimetaspis hoeli
 †Cephalaspis ibex (Wangsjö, 1952) = Machairaspis ibex
 †Cephalaspis jarviki (Wangsjö, 1952) = Diademaspis jarviki
 †Cephalaspis magnifica (Traquair, 1893) = Trewinia magnifica
 †Cephalaspis microtuberculata (Obruchev, 1961) = Escuminaspis laticeps
 †Cephalaspis pagei (Lankester, 1868) = Janaspis pagei
 †Cephalaspis patteni (Robertson, 1936) = Levesquaspis patteni
 †Cephalaspis powriei (Lankester, 1868) = Janaspis powriei
 †Cephalaspis rosamundae (Roberts, 1937) = Escuminaspis laticeps
 †Cephalaspis rostrata (Agassiz, 1835) = Pteraspis rostrata
 †Cephalaspis salweyi (Egerton, 1857) = Zenaspis salweyi
 †Cephalaspis utahensis (Branson & Mehl, 1931) = Camptaspis utahensis

Other miscellaneous species once assigned to Cephalaspis

 †Cephalaspis abergavenniensis (White, 1963)
 †Cephalaspis acuticornis (Stensiö, 1927)
 †Cephalaspis billcrofti (White & Toombs, 1983)
 †Cephalaspis campbelltonensis (Whiteaves, 1881)
 †Cephalaspis cocculi (MacGillivray, 1921)
 †Cephalaspis cwmmillensis (White & Toombs, 1983)
 †Cephalaspis dawsoni (Lankester, 1870)
 †Cephalaspis djurinensis (Balabai, 1962)
 †Cephalaspis grabrielsei (Dineley & Loeffler, ?)
 †Cephalaspis isachseni (Stensiö, 1927)
 †Cephalaspis jexi (Traquair, 1893)
 †Cephalaspis peninsula (Pageau, 1969)
 †Cephalaspis schrenckii (Pander, ?)
 †Cephalaspis sp. "Forfar" (Trewin & Davidson, 1996)
 †Cephalaspis syndenhami (Pageau, 1969)
 †Cephalaspis traquairi (Stensio, ?)
 †Cephalaspis uternaria (?)
 †Cephalaspis vogti (Stensiö, 1927)
 †Cephalaspis watneliei (Stensiö, 1927)
 †Cephalaspis westolli (Russell, 1954)

References 

Janvier, P (1996) Early Vertebrates Oxford University Press;
Donoghue and Smith (2001) The anatomy of Turinia pagei (Powrie), and the phylogenetic status of the Thelodonti, Transactions of the Royal Society of Edinburgh: Earth Sciences, 92, p. 15-37

External links 
 Paleos Vertebrates 
 

Fossil taxa described in 1835

Early Devonian fish of Europe
Osteostraci genera
Paleozoic life of New Brunswick
Paleozoic life of Nova Scotia
Paleozoic life of Quebec